East Nottingham Meetinghouse, or Brick Meetinghouse, is a historic Friends meeting house located at Rising Sun, Cecil County, Maryland. It is of significance because of its association with William Penn who granted the site "for a Meeting House and Burial Yard, Forever" near the center of the  Nottingham Lots settlement and was at one time the largest Friends meeting house south of Philadelphia. The Philadelphia Half-Yearly Meeting was held here as early as 1725. During the Revolutionary War, an American Army hospital was established here in 1778 for sick and wounded troops under General William Smallwood's command and the Marquis de Lafayette's troops camped in the Meeting House woods on the first night of their march from the Head of Elk to victory at the Battle of Yorktown in 1781.

It was listed on the National Register of Historic Places in 1977.

References

External links
, including photo from 1979, at Maryland Historical Trust

Quaker meeting houses in Maryland
Churches in Cecil County, Maryland
Churches on the National Register of Historic Places in Maryland
Historic American Buildings Survey in Maryland
Religious buildings and structures completed in 1724
18th-century Quaker meeting houses
National Register of Historic Places in Cecil County, Maryland
1724 establishments in the Thirteen Colonies